The canton of Peyruis is a former administrative division in southeastern France. It was disbanded following the French canton reorganisation which came into effect in March 2015. It had 4,255 inhabitants (2012).

The canton comprised the following communes:
La Brillanne
Ganagobie
Lurs
Peyruis

Demographics

See also
Cantons of the Alpes-de-Haute-Provence department

References

Former cantons of Alpes-de-Haute-Provence
2015 disestablishments in France
States and territories disestablished in 2015